Jenny María Estrada Ruiz (Guayaquil, June 21, 1940) is an Ecuadorian writer and journalist.

She studied at "La Inmaculada" high school in Guayaquil and worked for the publication "El Universo".

Works
 Las mujeres de Guayaquil, siglo XVI al XX (1972)
 Personajes y circunstancias
 Matilde Hidalgo de Prócel, una mujer total (1981)
 Mujeres de Guayaquil (1984)
 La epopeya del Aviso Atahualpa (1990)
 Ancón en la historia petrolera ecuatoriana: 1911 - 1976
 El montubio
 Los italianos de Guayaquil

References

External links
"Jenny Estrada", Spanish Wikipedia
 Author's website

1940 births
Living people
20th-century Ecuadorian women writers
21st-century Ecuadorian women writers
Ecuadorian journalists
People from Guayaquil
Ecuadorian women journalists